Olearia elliptica, commonly known as the sticky daisy bush, is a shrub in the family Asteraceae and is native to New South Wales and Queensland in eastern Australia. It has scattered, sticky leaves and white flowers in summer and autumn.

Description
The upper surface of the leaves is sticky and the lower surface is a paler green. Each head has 8 to 23 white ray florets surrounding 8 to 30 yellow disc florets. Flowering occurs between November and May and the fruit are bristly achenes.

Taxonomy and naming
Olearia elliptica was first formally described in 1836 by Augustin Pyramus de Candolle who published the description in his 17-volume treatise, Prodromus Systematis Naturalis Regni Vegetabilis. The specific epithet (elliptica) is a Latin word meaning "a defective circle" or "an ellipse".

In 1993, Peter Shaw Green described two subspecies of O. elliptica that have been accepted by the Australian Plant Census:
 Olearia elliptica subsp. elliptica has more heads of flowers in the corymb (between 20 and 50) and occurs in continental New South Wales and Queensland;
 Olearia elliptica subsp. praetermissa is a smaller plant with between 8 and 15 flowers in the corymb and is endemic to Lord Howe Island. The epithet praetermissa is a Latin word meaning "overlooked", referring to the distinctness of this subspecies having only been recognised recently.

Distribution and habitat
Subspecies elliptica occurs from Berry northwards along central and eastern New South Wales to the Queensland border. It is found in areas of annual rainfall of over 900 mm in the Sydney Basin.

Use in horticulture
Sticky daisy bush adapts readily to cultivation, preferring acidic soils in part shade or sun.

References

elliptica
Asterales of Australia
Flora of New South Wales
Flora of Queensland
Plants described in 1836
Taxa named by Augustin Pyramus de Candolle